Wohlschlag Bay is a large bay indenting the western side of Ross Island, Antarctica, and lying between Harrison Bluff and Cape Royds. It was first charted by the Discovery Expedition under Robert Falcon Scott, 1901–1904, then named by the Advisory Committee on Antarctic Names (US-ACAN) in 1964 for Donald E. Wohlschlag, professor of biology at Stanford University, who outfitted the biology laboratories on the USNS Eltanin and at McMurdo Station.

Romanes Beach

Romanes Beach is a beach on the north shore of Wohlschlag Bay, just south of Harrison Bluff. It was named by the New Zealand Antarctic Place-Names Committee (NZ-APC) for W. Romanes, mountaineer assistant with the expedition.

Maumee Bight 
In association with the names of expedition ships grouped on this island, it was named after , a tanker that made at least 12 Antarctic deployments to the Ross Sea from 1969–70 to 1984–85.

Alcorta Rocks

The rocks were named by US-ACAN in 2000 for Jesse J. Alcorta, a year-round support employee with eight field seasons at McMurdo Station from 1992–93.

References

Bays of Ross Island